Rory Lamont (born 10 October 1982 in Perth) is a former rugby union player who played fullback and on the wing for Glasgow Warriors and Scotland. He prides himself on his versatility. Rory is the younger brother of Sean Lamont.

Rugby career

Club career 
He played for Northampton Saints due to the reputation of his older brother. He also played for Northampton Old Scouts RFC after having left Northampton Saints. He is yet another international to have played for the Scouts that includes Ben Cohen, Steve Thompson and Courtney Lawes.

In February 2009 it was announced that Rory was to join RC Toulon in France's Top 14.

On 27 November Rory terminated his contract himself as he felt he was not getting enough playing time risking him losing his place in his Scottish side, he was linked with a return to Northampton Saints as a winger but also to Harlequins and Saracens. He joined Glasgow Warriors in December 2011.

International career 

Lamont made a memorable try scoring debut for Scotland in the 2005 Six Nations Championship match against Wales at Murrayfield. He also played for Scotland As against Australia A in the experimental position of inside centre at national coach Frank Hadden request.

He played in the 2007 Rugby World Cup at full back, arguably being Scotland's best back in the tournament.
While playing Rugby on 8 March 2008, Scotland v England, Rory Lamont sustained a facial fracture.

He returned for the 2011 World Cup, but only played one game, against Georgia. During the match against France in the 2012 Six Nations Championship, Lamont broke his leg. He never managed to regain full fitness after this injury.

Retirement 
Lamont announced his retirement from professional rugby on 26 April 2013, citing his inability to recover fully from the broken leg he suffered against France the previous year as a deciding factor.

References

External links
Sale profile
Scotland profile
Toulon RC profile

1982 births
Living people
Expatriate rugby union players in France
Glasgow Warriors players
RC Toulonnais players
Rugby union players from Perth, Scotland
Sale Sharks players
Scotland international rugby union players
Scottish expatriate rugby union players
Scottish expatriate sportspeople in France
Scottish rugby union players
Rugby union wings